Minuscule 737 (in the Gregory-Aland numbering), Θε306 (von Soden), is a Greek minuscule manuscript of the New Testament written on parchment. Palaeographically it has been assigned to the 13th century. The manuscript has no complex contents. Scrivener labelled it as 755e.

Description 

The codex contains the text of the Gospel of Matthew, on 176 parchment leaves (size ). The text is written in one column per page, 28-30 lines per page.

Text 

The Greek text of the codex is a representative of the Byzantine text-type. Aland placed it in Category V.

History 

Scrivener and Gregory dated the manuscript to the 13th century. The manuscript is currently dated by the INTF to the 13th century.

The manuscript was added to the list of New Testament manuscripts by Scrivener (755) and Gregory (737). It was examined and described by Paulin Martin. Gregory saw the manuscript in 1885.

The manuscript is now housed at the Bibliothèque nationale de France (Gr. 204) in Paris.

See also 

 List of New Testament minuscules
 Biblical manuscript
 Textual criticism

References

Further reading 

 

Greek New Testament minuscules
13th-century biblical manuscripts
Bibliothèque nationale de France collections